The 1942 Washington State Cougars football team was an American football team that represented Washington State College during the 1942 college football season. Seventeenth-year head coach Babe Hollingbery led the team to a 5–1–1 mark in the PCC and 6–2–2 overall. Two home games were played on campus at Rogers Field in Pullman and two in Spokane at Gonzaga Stadium.

The season was Hollingbery's last and marked the longest tenure at the school. Two seasons were missed, and Cougar football returned in 1945.

Schedule

References

External links
 Game program: Oregon at WSC – October 3, 1942
 Game program: Montana at WSC – October 10, 1942
 Game program: Michigan State vs. WSC at Spokane – November 7, 1942
 Game program: Second Air Force vs. WSC at Spokane – November 21, 1942

Washington State
Washington State Cougars football seasons
Washington State Cougars football